Tim and Eric's Billion Dollar Movie is a 2012 American absurdist comedy film starring, written, directed, and produced by the comedy duo Tim & Eric (Tim Heidecker and Eric Wareheim) in their feature directorial debuts. The plot follows Heidecker and Wareheim, playing fictionalized versions of themselves, who are forced to re-open an abandoned mall to pay back a wasted billion-dollar loan. The supporting cast includes Zach Galifianakis, Will Ferrell, John C. Reilly, Ray Wise, Twink Caplan, Robert Loggia, Jeff Goldblum, Bob Odenkirk, and Will Forte.

The film premiered at the 2012 Sundance Film Festival and was released in theaters on March 2, 2012, before being released to iTunes and on-demand January 27, 2013. It received negative critical reviews on its original release.

Plot
Tim Heidecker and Eric Wareheim are two filmmakers who are given a record-setting $1 billion budget to make a movie starring Johnny Depp titled Bonjour, Diamond Jim, based on a poem by "personal shopper and spiritual guru" Jim Joe Kelly. The funds are provided by the powerful Tommy Schlaaang and the Schlaaang Corporation. However, during production of the film the two waste all of their money on expensive makeovers, 10-course lunches, real diamonds for Diamond Jim's suit, and a $500,000 a week salary for Kelly, as well as accidentally hiring a professional Johnny Depp impersonator to star in the film instead of the real Johnny Depp. Ultimately, the finished film is only three minutes long. The Schlaaang executives, furious at having been delivered an unreleasable film, hold Tim and Eric personally accountable for paying back the one billion dollars they were trusted with, under threat that they will go to prison or be hunted down by the Schlaaang Corp. With their finances gone, Tim and Eric tearfully relieve Jim Joe Kelly of his services.

After a night of self-destructive partying, the pair see an advertisement in a nightclub bathroom for the sale of the S'Wallow Valley Mall, in which its owner Damien Weebs repeatedly claims that whoever buys and runs the mall will make one billion dollars in profit. Tim and Eric decide to reinvent themselves as businessmen, dubbing their newly founded company Dobis PR, and depart Los Angeles to purchase the dilapidated mall from Weebs and renovate it, in the hopes that they will make back their billion-dollar debt. While trying to refurbish the mall, they must deal with vagrants such as a mentally ill man-child named Taquito, bizarre stores (such as Reggie's Used Toilet Paper Discount Warehouse), and a man-eating wolf that stalks the food court.

During their time at the S'Wallow Valley Mall, Tim and Eric also face many challenges, such as an angry shop owner named Allen Bishopman who "doesn't want anything to change", and the fact that Eric is in love with Katie, a woman who works at the mall (whom Eric also compulsively masturbates to). Because of this, Tim poisons Eric and ends up making love to Katie, whilst Eric goes to the Shrim Alternative Healing Center, run by Dr. Doone Struts to seek "spiritual healing", only to be placed in a bathtub which gets filled with diarrhea by Struts' sons as part of the "spiritual healing". After the event, Eric finds Tim sleeping with Katie and subsequently fights Tim. After the fight, Eric apologizes to Tim for starting the fight and understands why Tim made love to Katie.

Despite their best efforts, the newly reopened mall fails to generate one billion dollars in revenue. They are eventually discovered by the Schlaaang Corporation after Bishopman turns them in. After a dramatic shootout in front of the mall, in which most of the main characters are killed, Tim and Eric manage to kill the members of the Schlaaang Corporation, and are sentenced to death for murder.

However, it is revealed that the preceding events are actually a film the two were showing to Steven Spielberg, who pronounces it the greatest movie ever made. Tim and Eric then celebrate with their Awesome Show co-stars.

Cast

 Tim Heidecker as himself
 Eric Wareheim as himself
 Zach Galifianakis as Jim Joe Kelly
 Will Ferrell as Damien Weebs
 Will Forte as Allen Bishopman
 John C. Reilly as Taquito
 Jeff Goldblum as Chef Goldblum
 Bob Ross as himself
 Robert Loggia as Tommy Schlaaang
 William Atherton as Earle Swinter
 Ray Wise as Dr. Doone Struts
 Twink Caplan as Katie
 Bob Odenkirk as Schlaaang Announcer
 Noah Spencer as Jeffrey
 Erica Durance as French Waitress
 Sunshine Lee and Palmer Scott as Shrim Gods
John Downey III as Cornell
 Todd Wagner as Hobo
 Ronnie Rodriguez as Johnny Depp
 Howie Slater as Steven Spielberg
 Mark Cuban as himself
 Michael Gross as Narrator
Several members of the Tim & Eric's television series Awesome Show, Great Job! and Check It Out! with Dr. Steve Brule regular cast appear as themselves - A. D. Miles, Ron Lynch, James Quall, Robert Axelrod, David Liebe Hart, Tennessee Winston Luke, Bob Druwing, Carol Kraft, Michael Q. Schmidt, Ron Austar, Warren Stearns, Ron Stark, Chuck Spitler, Sire, Doug Lussenhop, and Jay Mawhinney.

Production
Portions of the film were shot in the Coachella Valley, California, and Palm Springs at the abandoned Desert Fashion Plaza which was used for S'wallow Valley Mall. Tim and Eric had originally planned to use an entire town but for budgetary reasons it was scaled back to a mall. The idea for a dying shopping center came from Monroeville Mall (of Dawn of the Dead fame) and Hunt Valley Mall in Baltimore. Like the fictional mall, Hunt Valley was in fact redeveloped from top to bottom except the interior walkways have been converted to open-air and was successful upon its "grand reopening". The same went for Desert Fashion Plaza which was in the process of being de-malled and re-imagined as a new "Main Street" at the time filming began, lending authenticity to the movie setting. 

Before the movie's release Tim and Eric started the Billion Dollar Pledge asking fans and celebrities to support them by signing a document stating they would not illegally download the film, and also not to see its box office competition The Lorax. Stars who took part in the pledge ranged from comedians and actors Ben Stiller, Mark Proksch, Bob Odenkirk, Seth Green, Peter Serafinowicz, Todd Barry, Rashida Jones, and others, to musicians Weird Al Yankovic, Maynard James Keenan, Josh Groban, the Yeah Yeah Yeahs, and Maroon 5.

On January 1, 2021, Tim and Eric hosted a watch-along of Billion Dollar Movie. As part of it, they discussed the outline for the unproduced sequel, Trillion Dollar Movie, which would involve the duo being kidnapped by the dictator of an African country and forced to make a Saturday Night Live-style show.

Release
The film premiered at the 2012 Sundance Film Festival in January 2012. In an interview, the duo deadpanned that the film was spliced together with out-takes from the DVD release of Rango.

Box office
Tim and Eric's Billion Dollar Movie opened to 24 theaters on March 2, 2012 and grossed $87,475 in its opening weekend, ranking at #42. It would go on for another 7 weeks before closing to only $201,436 in the domestic box office.

Critical reception

Tim and Eric's Billion Dollar Movie received negative reviews from critics on its original release. The film ranking website Rotten Tomatoes rated the film "rotten", with 36% of the 74 critics sampled giving the film positive reviews, with an average score of 4.26/10. The website's critics consensus reads: "Tim & Eric's Billion Dollar Movie is on a gleeful quest to repulse audiences, but sometimes less is more with this sketchy duo." Variety gave the film a negative review, feeling that Tim and Eric "torture their purposefully inept, shortform sketch work into feature length...to diminishing returns" and that "fans of their Cartoon Network series or those simply familiar with the pair via YouTube will likely find the extended version of their pathos-and-pain-driven comedy hard to digest." The Hollywood Reporter gave the film a negative review, stating "Auds attuned to Tim & Eric's weird wavelength will find plenty of guffaws in the first half, but a plot this thin can't sustain comedy based on discomfort." The A.V. Club gave the film a B+ rating, opining that the film "feels genuinely dangerous and transgressive: it makes a virtue of going way too far because other comedies don't go far enough." Roger Ebert gave the film half a star out of 4 and said it was so bad, it wouldn't even qualify for a review in a book consisting solely of reviews of terrible movies (along the lines of his "Your Movie Sucks" editions).

References

External links
 
 
 
 
 
 

2012 films
2012 comedy films
American independent films
American comedy films
Films about filmmaking
Films based on television series
Films shot in California
Films shot in Los Angeles
Films shot in Palm Springs, California
Gary Sanchez Productions films
Tim & Eric
American black comedy films
Surreal comedy films
Funny or Die
Cultural depictions of Steven Spielberg
2012 directorial debut films
2010s English-language films
2010s American films